Simpson County is a county located in the U.S. state of Mississippi. Its western border is formed by the Pearl River, an important transportation route in the 19th century. As of the 2020 census, the population was 25,949. The county seat is Mendenhall. The county is named for Josiah Simpson (1787-1817), a territorial judge who also served as a delegate to Mississippi's Constitutional Convention. 

Simpson County is part of the Jackson, MS Metropolitan Statistical Area.

Geography

Major highways
  U.S. Highway 49
  Mississippi Highway 13
  Mississippi Highway 28
  Mississippi Highway 43
  Mississippi Highway 149

Adjacent counties
 Rankin County (north)
 Smith County (east)
 Covington County (southeast)
 Jefferson Davis County (south)
 Lawrence County (southwest)
 Copiah County (west)

Demographics

2020 census

As of the 2020 United States census, there were 25,949 people, 9,486 households, and 6,617 families residing in the county.

2000 census
As of the census of 2000, there were 27,639 people, 10,076 households, and 7,385 families residing in the county. The population density was 47 people per square mile (18/km2). There were 11,307 housing units at an average density of 19 per square mile (7/km2). The racial makeup of the county was 64.39% White, 34.31% Black or African American, 0.12% Native American, 0.14% Asian, 0.01% Pacific Islander, 0.47% from other races, and 0.56% from two or more races. 1.15% of the population were Hispanic or Latino of any race.

There were 10,076 households, out of which 34.80% had children under the age of 18 living with them, 54.20% were married couples living together, 14.80% had a female householder with no husband present, and 26.70% were non-families. 24.00% of all households were made up of individuals, and 11.10% had someone living alone who was 65 years of age or older. The average household size was 2.65 and the average family size was 3.14.

In the county, the population was spread out, with 27.90% under the age of 18, 9.40% from 18 to 24, 27.50% from 25 to 44, 22.10% from 45 to 64, and 13.10% who were 65 years of age or older. The median age was 35 years. For every 100 females, there were 94.40 males. For every 100 females age 18 and over, there were 90.40 males.

The median income for a household in the county was $28,343, and the median income for a family was $32,797. Males had a median income of $27,197 versus $20,136 for females. The per capita income for the county was $13,344. About 17.50% of families and 21.60% of the population were below the poverty line, including 25.70% of those under age 18 and 21.00% of those age 65 or over.

Communities

Cities
 Magee
 Mendenhall

Town
 D'Lo

Village
 Braxton

Unincorporated communities
 Harrisville
 Merry Hell
 Pinola
 Sanatorium

Ghost town
 Westville

Politics

See also
 Dry counties
 National Register of Historic Places listings in Simpson County, Mississippi

References

 
Mississippi counties
Jackson metropolitan area, Mississippi
1824 establishments in Mississippi
Populated places established in 1824